Halle is an electoral constituency (German: Wahlkreis) represented in the Bundestag. It elects one member via first-past-the-post voting. Under the current constituency numbering system, it is designated as constituency 72. It is located in southern Saxony-Anhalt, comprising the city of Halle (Saale) and part of the Saalekreis district.

Halle was created for the inaugural 1990 federal election after German reunification. Since 2021, it has been represented by Karamba Diaby of the Social Democratic Party (SPD).

Geography
Halle is located in southern Saxony-Anhalt. As of the 2021 federal election, it comprises the independent city of Halle (Saale) and the municipalities of Kabelsketal, Landsberg, and Petersberg from the Saalekreis district.

History
Halle was created after German reunification in 1990, then known as Halle-Altstadt. It acquired its current name in the 2002 election. In the 1990 through 1998 elections, it was constituency 291 in the numbering system. In the 2002 through 2009 elections, it was number 73. Since the 2013 election, it has been number 72.

Originally, it comprised the independent city of Halle (Saale) without Halle-Neustadt. In the 2002 and 2005 elections, it was coterminous with the city of Halle (Saale). It acquired its current borders in the 2009 election.

Members
The constituency was first represented by Uwe-Bernd Lühr of the Free Democratic Party (FDP) from 1990 to 1994. As of 2021, this remains only occasion since the 1957 federal election in which the FDP has won a federal constituency. Christel Riemann-Hanewinckel of the Social Democratic Party (SPD) was elected representative in 1994, and served until 2009. In the 2009 election, Petra Sitte of The Left was elected. Christoph Bergner of the Christian Democratic Union (CDU) won the constituency in 2013 and served a single term. Christoph Bernstiel was elected in the 2017 election. Karamba Diaby regained it for the SPD in 2021.

Election results

2021 election

2017 election

2013 election

2009 election

References

Federal electoral districts in Saxony-Anhalt
1990 establishments in Germany
Constituencies established in 1990